Ledio Pano (born 23 May 1968) is an Albanian retired professional football player. Ledio Pano holds the world record of the best penalty kick scoring ratio being successful 50 out of 50 attempts. He is the son of Panajot Pano who is widely regarded as one of the best footballers in the history of Albanian football.

Club career
In Albania he played for Partizani Tirana, where he began his professional career, and Luftëtari Gjirokastër.

He played much of his career in Greece with Skoda Xanthi, Panelefsiniakos and PAS Giannina.

International career
He made his debut for Albania in an April 1987 European Championship qualification match at home against Austria and earned a total of 9 caps, scoring 1 goal. His final international was an August 1996 friendly match against Greece.

International statistics
Source:

International goals
Albania score listed first, score column indicates score after each Pano goal.

Personal life
Ledio is of Greek descent. He is the son of former Partizani striker Panajot Pano, who was Albania's Golden Player for the UEFA Jubilee Awards.

Honours
Albanian Superliga: 1
 1987

Albanian Cup: 2
 1988, 1992

References

External links

1968 births
Living people
Albanian people of Greek descent
Association football midfielders
Association football forwards
Albanian footballers
Albania international footballers
FK Partizani Tirana players
Luftëtari Gjirokastër players
Xanthi F.C. players
Panargiakos F.C. players
Panelefsiniakos F.C. players
PAS Giannina F.C. players
Kategoria Superiore players
Albanian expatriate footballers
Expatriate footballers in Greece
Albanian expatriate sportspeople in Greece